Year 1121 (MCXXI) was a common year starting on Saturday (link will display the full calendar) of the Julian calendar.

Events 
 By place 

 Byzantine Empire 
 Emperor John II (Komnenos) recovers southwestern Anatolia (modern Turkey) from the Seljuk Turks and then hastens to the Balkans, where the Pechenegs are continuing their incursions. He transfers Byzantine troops to the Danube frontier at Paristrion.

 Levant 
 Summer – Seljuk forces under Toghtekin make extensive raids into Galilee. King Baldwin II, in reprisal, crosses the Jordan River with a Crusader army, and ravages the countryside. He occupies and destroys a fortress that Toghtekin has built at Jerash.

 Europe 
 March 2 – Petronilla of Lorraine becomes regent of Holland (Low Countries) after her husband, Floris II (the Fat) dies. He is succeeded by his 6-year-old son Dirk VI (or Theodoric).
 A large rebellion takes place in Córdoba (modern Spain) against the ruling Almoravid Dynasty.

 England 
 January 24 – Adeliza of Louvain, age 17, marries King Henry I two months after the accidental death of the heir to the English throne, Henry's only legitimate son, William Adelin.

 Eurasia 
 Summer – Sultan Mahmud II of the Seljuk Empire declares a Holy War on Georgia. He sends an expedition under Ilghazi ibn Arttuq, Artukid ruler of Mardin, to invade Georgia.
 August 12 – Battle of Didgori: King David IV (the Builder) of Georgia, with a Georgian army (55,600 men), defeats the 300,000-strong Seljuk coalition forces at Mount Didgori.

 Asia 
 Emperor Hui Zong sends an expedition to crush the rebellion at Hangzhou (modern-day Zhejiang) in China. The rebels are defeated, their leader Fang La is captured and executed.

 By topic 

 Religion 
 Spring – Peter Abelard, a French theologian and philosopher, is condemned and charged with the heresy of Sabellius in a synod at Soissons. Abelard writes Sic et Non.
 April 22 – Antipope Gregory VIII (supported by  Emperor Henry V) is arrested by papal troops at Sutri. He is taken to Rome and imprisoned in the Septizonium.
 December 25 (Christmas Day) – The Praemonstratensian Order (Norbertines) is formed, when a group of canons make solemn vows at Prémontré.
 Henry I founds Reading Abbey in England. The Cluniac Order populates the abbey.
 The third and largest church is completed at Cluny Abbey (modern France).
 L'Aumône Abbey is founded by Count Theobald IV of Blois at Loir-et-Cher.

Births 
 Ascelina, French Cistercian nun and mystic (d. 1195)
 Chōgen, Japanese Buddhist monk (kanjin) (d. 1206)
 Henry of France, archbishop of Reims (d. 1175)
 Joscelin of Louvain, Flemish nobleman (d. 1180)
 Kojijū, Japanese noblewoman and poet (d. 1202)

Deaths 
 January 7 – Erminold, German Benedictine abbot 
 January 18 – William of Champeaux, French philosopher
 February 10 – Domnall Ua Lochlainn, Irish king (b. 1048)
 March 2 – Floris II (the Fat), count of Holland (b. 1085)
 April 23 – Jón Ögmundsson, Icelandic bishop (b. 1052)
 August 7 – Ulrich I (or Udalrich), German bishop
 December 11 – Al-Afdal Shahanshah, Fatimid caliph (b. 1066)
 December 13 – Ulrich of Eppenstein, German abbot
 Abd al-Aziz ibn Mansur, Hammadid governor and ruler
 Alfanus II (or Alfano), Lombard archbishop of Salerno
 Al-Tughrai, Persian official, poet and alchemist (b. 1061)
 Bartolf Leslie (or Bartholomew), Scottish nobleman
 Fang La, Chinese rebel leader (executed in Kaifeng)
 Frederick of Liege, German prince-bishop and saint
 Lü Shinang, Chinese religious leader (Manichaean cult)
 Masud Sa'd Salman, Persian poet (approximate date)
 Muireadhach Ua Flaithbheartaigh, king of Iar Connacht
 Robert of Bounalbergo, Norman nobleman and crusader
 Zhou Bangyan, Chinese bureaucrat and ci poet (b. 1056)
 Zhou Tong, Chinese archery teacher and martial artist

References 

 

da:1120'erne#1121